Grand Prix of Aargau Canton is a semi classic European bicycle race held in Aargau canton, one of the more northerly cantons of Switzerland.

The race consists of fifteen laps around the Swiss town of Gippingen, which belongs to the municipality of Leuggern.

Winners

References

External links
  
 2009 Race report

Cycle races in Switzerland
UCI Europe Tour races
Recurring sporting events established in 1964
1964 establishments in Switzerland
Aargau
Summer events in Switzerland